Lacu may refer to:
 Lacu (musician), the former drummer of Hanoi Rocks
 Lacu, a Romanian skete on Mount Athos
 Lacu, a village in Odăile Commune, Buzău County, Romania
 Lacu, a village in Geaca Commune, Cluj County, Romania